The SUBE card (standing for Sistema Único de Boleto Electrónico; literal English translation: Unique Electronic Ticket System) is a contactless smart card system introduced in Argentina in February 2009. It is used on public transport services within the Buenos Aires metropolitan area and other Argentine cities and was promoted by the Argentine Secretary of Transportation. It is valid on a number of different travel systems across the city including the Underground, buses and trains.

One of the benefits of this change is that it has helped speed passengers on to the bus. People no longer had to wait to be issued a printed receipt as they each enter the bus. Environmentally this should help reduce emissions of carbon dioxide and nitrogen because buses don't have to idle as long while passengers load, helping improve air quality in the city. The electronic ticket is eliminating the printed receipts thus lowering the amount of littering in the city. The city, in turn, no longer have to process, collect, count, and transport coinage received in payment of some 11 million trips per day.

Background
Buenos Aires was affected for several years by an acute coin shortage that impacted the economy, banking, and transportation.  Coins are still rationed by banks, and a thriving black market has been hoarding to sell coins illegally to retailers. Merchants have been rounding prices up or down according to the amount of change a customer actually has, or bartering, and making up the difference with a menial item.
The fact that the vast majority of users need to purchase ahead sufficient credit for tickets and passes including highways tolls even for a complete month makes the SUBE card system carry a float of several million pesos which allows for financial backing of various activities at local government level and also, it took too much time for the customers to pay with coins in a rushing city with millions of people. The system is administered by Banco de la Nacion Argentina.

Use
The SUBE card can be used on several transports method, including Greater Buenos Aires area Buses, Trains, Buenos Aires Metro, and several toll roads. Furthermore, the system has expanded to the mayor cities of Argentina: among others Mar del Plata, Villa Gesell, La Costa Partido, Pinamar, Bahía Blanca, Corrientes, Neuquén, Río Grande, Ushuaia, Formosa, San Salvador de Jujuy, Paraná and Santa Fe,

Bus 
According to official SUBE website it can be used in all national, province and municipal buses lines within Greater Buenos Aires Area. Here is the full list:

National Lines 
1, 2, 4, 5, 6, 7, 8, 9, 10, 12, 15, 17, 19, 20, 21, 22, 23, 24, 25, 26, 28, 29, 32, 33, 34, 36, 37, 39, 41, 42, 44, 45, 46, 47, 49, 50, 51, 53, 55, 56, 57, 59, 60, 61, 62, 63, 64, 65, 67, 68, 70, 71, 74, 75, 76, 78, 79, 80, 84, 85, 86, 87, 88, 91, 92, 93, 95, 96, 97, 98, 99, 100, 101, 102, 103, 104, 105, 106, 107, 108, 109, 110, 111, 112, 113, 114, 115, 117, 118, 123, 124, 126, 127, 128, 129, 130, 132, 133, 134, 135, 136, 140, 141, 143, 146, 148, 150, 151, 152, 153, 154, 158, 159, 160, 161, 163, 165, 166, 168, 169, 172, 174, 175, 176, 177, 178, 179, 180, 181, 182, 184, 185, 188, 193, 194, 195.

Province Lines 
200, 202, 203, 204, 205, 214, 215, 218, 219, 222, 228, 236, 237, 238, 239, 242, 243, 245, 247, 252, 253, 256, 257, 263, 264, 266, 269, 271, 273, 275, 276, 277, 278, 281, 283, 284, 288, 289, 291, 293, 295, 297, 298, 299, 300, 304, 306, 307, 310, 311, 312, 313, 314, 315, 317, 318, 321, 322, 323, 324, 325, 326, 327, 328, 329, 333, 336, 338, 340, 341, 343, 350, 354, 355, 364, 365, 370, 371, 372, 373, 378, 379, 382, 383, 384, 385, 388, 391, 392, 394, 395, 403, 404, 405, 406, 407, 410, 418, 421, 422, 429, 430, 432, 435, 436, 437, 440, 441, 443, 445, 446, 448, 44.

Municipal Lines 

 Almirante Brown: 501(A), 505, 506(C), 510(A), 514, 515 and 521(B).
 Avellaneda: 570.
 Berazategui: 603 and 619.
 Brandsen: 500(B).
 Campana: 505(A).
 Cañuelas: 502.
 Escobar: 503(B), 505(A), 506(B), 507(B), 508(A), 511(A) and 513(A).
 Esteban Echeverría: 501(C).
 Ezeiza: 518.
 Florencio Varela: 500(F), 501(E), 502(C), 503(D), 504(C), 505(B/C), 506(D), 507, 508(B), 509(B), 510(C), 511(C), 512(C) and 513(B).
 General Rodríguez: 500(A).
 General San Martín: 670.
 José C. Paz: 741 and 749.
 Junín: Blue 1, Blue 2, Red and Green lines.
 La Matanza: 620, 621, 622, 624, 628 and 630.
 La Plata: East, West, North and South lines.
 Lanús: 520(B), 521(A), 522, 523, 524, 526 and 527.
 Lobos: 501(D) and 502(A).
 Lomas de Zamora: 532, 540, 541, 542, 543, 544, 548, 549, 550, 551, 552, 553, 561, 562 and 564.
 Luján: 500(C), 501(F), 502(B), 503(E).
 Mercedes: 1(B) and 2(B).
 Merlo: 500(D), 503(A) and 504(A).
 Moreno: 500(D), 501(G) and 503.
 Morón: 634, 635.
 Pilar: 501(B/I/H), 506(A), 510(B), 511(B), 520(A).
 Quilmes: 580, 582, 583, 584 and 585.
 San Fernando: 710.
 San Isidro: 707.
 San Miguel: 740.
 San Vicente: 503(C).
 Tigre: 720, 721, 722 and 723.
 Zárate: 500(E) and 503(F).

Buenos Aires Underground 
All lines including:
 Line A
 Line B
 Line C
 Line D
 Line E
 Line H
 Premetro

Trains 
All the following lines:
 Belgrano Norte Line
 Belgrano Sur Line
 Mitre Line
 Roca Line
 San Martín Line
 Sarmiento Line
 Tren de la Costa
 Urquiza Line

Tolls roads 
From the beginning of 2014, several tolls road could be paid by SUBE card:
 Autopistas del Oeste
 Autopistas del Sol

Controversies
The project was led by Global Infrastructure (GI), owned by the British businessman Stephen Chandler. The Argentine newspaper La Nación noted that the fiscal address of GI was that of a local hairdresser, and their employees were not actually working for GI nor receiving the informed payments. The secretary of transport had also chosen Global Infrastructure despite being $10,000,000 more expensive than other offerings. La Nación also pointed out that GI did not exist before the tender. When all this info came to light, the contract with GI was cancelled.

See also

Transport in Argentina

References

Transport in Argentina
Buenos Aires Underground
Transport in Buenos Aires
Ubiquitous computing
Political scandals in Argentina
Political scandals in the United Kingdom
Contactless smart cards